Bromage is a surname. Notable people with the surname include:

Adrian Bromage (born 1971), Australian rules footballer
Billy Bromage, English footballer
Enos Bromage (1898–1978), English footballer
Enos Bromage (footballer, born 1864) (c. 1865 – 1947), 19th-century English footballer
Harry Bromage, English footballer
Keith Bromage (born 1937), Australian rules footballer
Russell Bromage (born 1959), English footballer and manager